Winchester is an unincorporated community in northwest Fayette County, Texas, United States.

Education
Winchester is located in the La Grange Independent School District.

References 

Unincorporated communities in Fayette County, Texas
Unincorporated communities in Texas